Christy Manzinga (born 31 January 1995) is a professional footballer who plays for Hungarian club Zalaegerszeg, as a striker. Born in France, he has represented DR Congo at youth international level.

Club career
Born in Saint-Germain-en-Laye, Manzinga began his career with Paris Saint-Germain at the age of 13. He then played for Lorient, Angers II and Sporting Châtelet, before signing with Scottish club Motherwell in July 2019, following a trial.

On 30 November 2019, Manzinga scored a goal on his Motherwell debut to round off a 4–0 win against St. Johnstone. On 31 May 2020, Motherwell confirmed that Manzinga was leaving the club at the end of his contract.

On 1 August 2020, he signed for Northern Irish club Linfield, on a two-year contract. He left the club in June 2022. Later that month he signed for Hungarian club Zalaegerszegi TE.

International career
Manzinga has represented DR Congo at under-20 level.

Career statistics

Honours 
Linfield
 NIFL Premiership: 2020–21
 Irish Cup: 2020–21

References

1995 births
Living people
French footballers
Democratic Republic of the Congo footballers
Democratic Republic of the Congo under-20 international footballers
Paris Saint-Germain F.C. players
FC Lorient players
Angers SCO players
R. Châtelet S.C. players
Motherwell F.C. players
Linfield F.C. players
Zalaegerszegi TE players
Scottish Professional Football League players
NIFL Premiership players
Association football forwards
French expatriate footballers
Democratic Republic of the Congo expatriate footballers
French expatriate sportspeople in Belgium
Expatriate footballers in Belgium
French expatriate sportspeople in Scotland
Expatriate footballers in Scotland
French expatriate sportspeople in Northern Ireland
Expatriate association footballers in Northern Ireland
French expatriate sportspeople in Hungary
Expatriate footballers in Hungary
21st-century Democratic Republic of the Congo people
Nemzeti Bajnokság I players
Democratic Republic of the Congo expatriate sportspeople in Belgium
Democratic Republic of the Congo expatriate sportspeople in Scotland
Democratic Republic of the Congo expatriate sportspeople in Northern Ireland
Democratic Republic of the Congo expatriate sportspeople in Hungary